German submarine U-121 was a long-lived Type IIB U-boat built during World War II for service in Nazi Germany's Kriegsmarine. U-121 spent the entire war as a training vessel and was scuttled at the end of the conflict.

U-121 was one of two Type II U-boats built at Flender Werke in Lübeck. Like her sister boat  (also built in Lübeck), she was originally constructed for export to China. The advent of World War II and the increased training needs of the U-Boot-Waffe led the German high command to assign U-120 and U-121 to the training command instead.

Built for China
The Chinese Nationalist Government used 10,000,000 Marks to order two Type IIB U-boats in 1937. They also dispatched 80 men to Germany for training in submarine operations. The Japanese Government complained over this transaction, so the Chinese took their money back and the pair of Type IIB submarines joined the Kriegsmarine after the outbreak of the Second World War in Europe. They were U-120 and U-121.

Design
German Type IIB submarines were enlarged versions of the original Type IIs. U-121 had a displacement of  when at the surface and  while submerged. She had two shafts and two  propellers.

U-121 was fitted with three  torpedo tubes at the bow, five torpedoes or up to twelve Type A torpedo mines, and a  anti-aircraft gun. The boat had a complement of twentyfive.

References

Bibliography

External links

German Type II submarines
U-boats commissioned in 1940
World War II submarines of Germany
1940 ships
Ships built in Lübeck
Operation Regenbogen (U-boat)
Maritime incidents in May 1945